The 1995 Jordanian  League (known as The Jordanian  League, was the 45th season of Jordan League since its inception in 1944. Al-Wehdat won its 5th title.

Teams

Map

League standings

Overview
It was contested by 12 teams, and  Al-Wehdat won the championship.

References
Jordan - List of final tables (RSSSF)

Jordanian Pro League seasons
Jordan
football
football